Panteniphididae is a small family of mites in the order Mesostigmata.

Species
Panteniphididae contains two genera, with four recognized species:

 Genus Lindquistoseius Genis, Loots & Ryke, 1969
 Lindquistoseius africanus Genis, Loots & Ryke, 1969
 Lindquistoseius tanzaniae (Hirschmann, 1983)
 Genus Panteniphis Willmann, 1949
 Panteniphis athiasae Hirschmann, 1983
 Panteniphis mirandus Willmann, 1949

References

Mesostigmata
Acari families